Robert Simpkins (born 23 May 1960) is a former Australian professional rugby league player. During his career, he played in a number of positions, primarily as a lock, hooker and centre. He played eleven seasons in the NSWRL, notching 160 appearances in the competition for South Sydney (1981–83), the Eastern Suburbs (1984–87) and the Gold Coast Chargers (1988–91).

Simpkins' son, Ryan (born 1988), played for the Penrith Panthers and Gold Coast Titans.

References

1960 births
Living people
Australian rugby league players
Gold Coast Chargers players
South Sydney Rabbitohs players
Sydney Roosters players
Rugby league locks